2005 Meistriliiga was the 15th season of the Meistriliiga, Estonia's premier football league. TVMK won their first title.

Season overview
FC TVMK's first title-winning Meistriliiga campaign came in some style with strikers Tarmo Neemelo and Ingemar Teever scoring most of the goals and veteran midfielder Andrei Borissov leading the team from midfield. Narva Trans finished in bronze-medal position after years of being fourth in the final table, while FC Flora have been busy rebuilding their squad and therefore not too upset by a disappointing fourth position finish. FC Kuressaare went out of the league via play-offs and Dünamo's defensive displays were awful and the team never seemed to have any kind of chance in staying up.

Tarmo Neemelo in the end scored 41 goals for the champions, and earned a move to top Swedish club Helsingborgs IF, Maksim Gruznov of Narva Trans scored 26 goals, Vjatšeslav Zahovaiko of FC Flora and Ingemar Teever for the champions scored 19 goals each. The latter secured a free transfer to Swedish outfit Östers IF.

League table

Relegation play-off

2–2 on aggregate. Lasnamäe Ajax won on away goals.

Kuressaare kept their place in the Meistriliiga, after Pärnu Tervis decided not to make the promotion.

Results
Each team played every opponent four times, twice at home and twice on the road, for a total of 36 games.

First half of season

Second half of season

Season statistics

Top scorers

See also
 2004–05 Estonian Cup
 2005–06 Estonian Cup
 2005 Esiliiga

References

Meistriliiga seasons
1
Estonia
Estonia